The Hollars is a 2016 American comedy-drama film directed by John Krasinski and written by James C. Strouse. The film stars an ensemble cast led by Krasinski, starring Sharlto Copley, Charlie Day, Richard Jenkins, Anna Kendrick and Margo Martindale. The world premiere took place at the Sundance Film Festival on January 24, 2016, and it was released on August 26, 2016, by Sony Pictures Classics.

Plot
Struggling New York City graphic novelist John Hollar learns that his mother, Sally is diagnosed with a brain tumor, and joins his brother, Ron, and father, Don, by her side. Her attending physician Dr. Fong tells them that the tumor is scheduled to be removed later that week. John is also facing the birth of his first child with his girlfriend Rebecca. Ron is spying on his ex-wife Stacey, whom he divorced years ago, but he is confronted by her new partner Reverend Dan. John meets his high school classmate and mother's nurse Jason, who married Gwen, John's ex-fiancée. Jason rightly suspects that Gwen only married him after becoming pregnant with their child, and still has feelings for John.

Don is forced to work at the wine shop to support his failing plumbing business. At night, Ron sneaks inside Stacey's house to see his two  daughters, but is subsequently arrested by the police when Stacey finds out. He is immediately bailed when Rev. Dan learns how much he loves his kids. One day before her operation, John and Sally sneak out of the hospital to enjoy her last meal. On the day of the operation, the doctors successfully remove the tumor, but later, she dies with Don at her side. Don emotionally reads a letter Sally wrote before she died. Rev. Dan marries John and Rebecca, and later, in the middle of their mother's funeral, John, Ron, and Don rush Rebecca to the hospital as she goes into labor.

Cast
 John Krasinski as John Hollar, Ron's brother
 Sharlto Copley as Ron Hollar, John's brother
 Richard Jenkins as Don Hollar, Ron and John's father
 Margo Martindale as Sally Hollar, Ron and John's mother
 Anna Kendrick as Rebecca, John's girlfriend
 Mary Elizabeth Winstead as Gwen, John's ex-fiancée
 Charlie Day as Jason, John's high school classmate and Gwen's husband
 Ashley Dyke as Stacey, Ron's ex-wife
 Josh Groban as Reverend Dan, Stacey's partner
 Randall Park as Dr. Fong, Sally's physician
 Mary Kay Place as Pam
 Tonea Stewart as Latisha

Production
On May 5, 2014, it was announced John Krasinski would direct the film, with Krasinski, Anna Kendrick, Margo Martindale and Richard Jenkins joining the cast. Principal photography and production began on July 15, 2014, and ended on August 15, 2014. Principal photography took place on location in Mississippi, including Brookhaven, Jackson and Canton. According to Krasinski, editing was completed on January 16, 2015. Josh Ritter composed the film's score.<ref>{{cite web|url=http://filmmusicreporter.com/2015/12/21/josh-ritter-scoring-john-krasinskis-the-hollars/|title=Josh Ritter Scoring John Krasinski's 'The Hollars|website=Film Music Reporter|date=December 21, 2015|accessdate=July 13, 2016}}</ref>

ReleaseThe Hollars premiered at the 2016 Sundance Film Festival on January 24, 2016. On January 29, 2016, Sony Pictures Classics acquired all rights to its United States and Asia release. The film was released on August 26, 2016, by Sony Pictures Classics.

Reception

Critical response
On review aggregator website Rotten Tomatoes, the film holds an approval rating of 47%, based on 92 reviews, with an average rating of 5.40/10. The site's critical consensus reads, "The Hollars'' gathers an impressive assortment of talented stars; unfortunately, it's all in service of a story that's been played out more effectively in countless other indie dramedies." Metacritic gives the film a score of 53 out of 100, based on 27 critics, indicating "mixed or average reviews".

Accolades

References

External links

2016 films
2010s English-language films
2016 comedy-drama films
American comedy-drama films
Films about dysfunctional families
Films directed by John Krasinski
Films set in Ohio
Films set in New York City
Films shot in Mississippi
Sony Pictures Classics films
2016 independent films
2010s American films